The main religions that exist or existed in Kurdistan are as follows: Sunni Islam, Shia Islam, Christianity, Zoroastrianism, Yarsanism, Yazidism, Alevism and Judaism. Sunni Islam is the most adhered religion in Kurdistan.

Islam

The majority of Kurdish people are Muslim by religion. While the relationship between religion and nationalism has usually been strained and ambivalent with the strong hold of the Islamic leaders in Kurdish society, it has generally been the conservative Muslim Kurds who formed the backbone of the Kurdish movements.

Sunni Islam 
The majority of Kurds are Sunni Muslims. The exact proportion is uncertain but McDowall gives the percentage as 'approximately 75%', while Martin van Bruinessen estimates around two thirds or three quarters at least. Most Sunni Kurds follow the Shafi‘i madhhab, which distinguishes them from Arab and Turkish neighbors who in general are Hanafi. This difference is identified by some Kurds as being essential to their ethnic identity and deliberately emphasized.

During the last six centuries, the Kurdish ulama had an influential role in the Ottoman court and taught at important universities like Al-Azhar University and in the Holy Cities of Arabia. Moreover, due to the location of Kurdistan between the three major cultural Islamic regions, many Kurdish ulama not only knew Kurdish but also Arabic, Persian and Turkish  giving them an important role in mediating between Indian Muslims who communicated in Persian and the Arabic– and Turkish– speaking world. Kurdish teaching also had a lasting impact in Indonesia.

Sunni Islam among Kurds is characterized by a strong overtone of mysticism and its scholars’ affiliation with Sufi orders. In Kurdish society these constitute a hierarchical system, in which the leaders (sheikh) deploy their influence onto the localities through their deputies (khalifa), who mediate between sheikhs and common people. Today, Naqshbandiya and Qadiriyya are the most active tariqas. These tariqas had produced numbers of significant figures in the early history of Kurdish nationalist movement, including Mahmud Barzanji of Qadiriyyah, and Sheikh Said and Sheikh Ubeydullah of Naqshbandiyyah. Strong influences of sheikhs in the late 19th and the early 20th centuries were attributed to the Ottoman administrative reforms and the defense against the intrusion of Christian missionaries.

Modern political development among Sunni Muslim Kurds varies throughout the state to which they belong. In Turkey, Said Nursi exerted major influence.  Nursi devoted himself to intellectual development. This became the basis of the Nur Movement which espoused Islamic Modernism, mysticism, compatibility with modern science and tolerance. The Nur movement garnered several million followings in the mid 20th century. The group fragmented substantially in the 1970s and 1980s, resulting in offshoots such as the Gülen movement.

Shia Islam 
There is a minority of Twelver Shi'i Muslims in southern parts of Kurdistan in Kermanshah province, Khanaqin, Mandali, and Ilam province. The proportion of Kurds who ascribe to Twelverism is potentially up to 15%.

Alevism 

An Alevi community mostly live in north western parts of Kurdistan. They are mostly concentrated in Tunceli Province.

Yazidism

Yazidism is a monotheistic ethnic religion with roots in a western branch of an Iranic pre-Zoroastrian religion. It is based on the belief of one God who created the world and entrusted it into the care of seven Holy Beings. The leader of this heptad is Tawûsê Melek, who is symbolized with a peacock. Its adherents number from 700,000 to 1 million worldwide and are indigenous to the Kurdish regions of Iraq, Syria and Turkey, with some significant, more recent communities in Russia, Georgia and Armenia established by refugees fleeing Muslim persecution in Ottoman Empire. Yazidism shares with Kurdish Alevism and Yarsanism a lot of similarities that date back to pre-Islam.

Yarsanism

Yarsanism (also known as Ahl-I-Haqq, Ahl-e-Hagh or Kakai) is also one of the religions that are associated with Kurdistan.

Although most of the sacred Yarsan texts are in the Gorani and all of the Yarsan holy places are located in Kurdistan, followers of this religion are also found in other regions.  For example, while there are more than 300,000 Yarsani in Iraqi Kurdistan, there are more than 2 million Yarsani in Iran. However, the Yarsani lack political rights in both countries.

Zoroastrianism
Zoroastrianism was one of the dominant religions in Kurdistan before the Islamic era. Currently, Zoroastrianism is an officially recognized religion in Iraqi Kurdistan and Iran and three Zoroastrian temples have opened in Iraqi Kurdistan after the official recognition of Zoroastrianism in the region in 2015. On 21 September 2016, the first official Zoroastrian fire temple of Iraqi Kurdistan opened in Sulaymaniyah. Attendees celebrated the occasion by lighting a ritual fire and beating the frame drum or 'daf'. 

The Zoroastrian community in Iraqi Kurdistan has claimed that thousands of people have recently converted to Zoroastrianism in the region, however this has not been confirmed by independent sources and there are no official figures on the Zoroastrian population in the region. In 2020, it was reported there were 60 Zoroastrian families in Iraqi Kurdistan. At the same time, Reuters claimed many new predominantly Kurdish converts to Zoroastrianism in the Kurdistan Region are not officially registered as such, but some 15,000 members are counted by the Yasna association, which represents Zoroastrians.

Christianity
Christianity is present in the Kurdistan Region of Iraq through the presence of several distinct communities, Kurdish Christians and non-Kurdish Chaldeans, Syriacs and Assyrians. The Chaldean, Syriac and Assyrian communities in the Kurdistan Region of Iraq live primarily in the Erbil and Dohuk Governorates.

Judaism

There used to be a Jewish minority in most parts of Kurdistan, but most of them were forced to flee to Israel in the mid-20th century. In the beginning of 20 century, the cities of Kermanshah, Orumieh, Piranshahr and Mahabad had the largest Jewish populations in Iranian Kurdistan.

According to recent reports, there were between 400 and 730 Jewish families living in the Kurdish region. However, Dr. Mordechai Zaken, an Israeli expert on Kurdish affairs, told the Jerusalem Post in November 2015 interview that the media reports on 430 Jewish families in Iraqi Kurdistan were false: "There were several dozen families that had some distant family connection to Judaism and most of them immigrated to Israel in the aftermath of the Gulf War...". 

On October 18, 2015, the Kurdistan Regional Government named Sherzad Omar Mamsani, a Kurdish Jew, as the Jewish representative of the Ministry of Endowment and Religious Affairs. In 2017 Rabbi Daniel Edri, a Chief rabbi of rabbinical coury of Haifa in Israel, claimed he was appointed the chief Rabbi of Kurdistan by the Kurdish Region's Minister of Endowment and Religious Affairs. In 2018, Sherzad Memsani was removed from his position.

Secularism
Kurdistan has been referred to as "the last safe haven for secularism" in a region rife with religious extremism. In 2012, the semi-autonomous Kurdistan Region declared that public schools were to be religiously neutral and that all major religions of the world are taught on an equal basis. As of 2012, KRG and Rojava (Syrian Kurdistan), are the only administrations in the entire region that do not openly endorse a single religion in public schools.

References

 
Kurdish culture
Christianity in Kurdistan
Jews and Judaism in Kurdistan
Jewish Kurdish history
Yarsanism
Religion in the Middle East
Zoroastrianism
Society of the Middle East